James Clyde may refer to:
James Clyde (actor), British actor
James Avon Clyde, Lord Clyde (1863–1944), Scottish politician and judge
James Latham Clyde, Lord Clyde (1898–1975), Scottish Unionist politician and judge
James Clyde, Baron Clyde (1932–2009), Scottish judge and British law lord
J. Clyde Mitchell (James Clyde Mitchell, 1918–1995), British sociologist and anthropologist